Perma.cc is a web archiving service for legal and academic citations founded by the Harvard Library Innovation Lab in 2013.

Concept
Perma.cc was created in response to studies showing high incidences of link rot in both academic publications and judicial opinions. By archiving copies of linked resources, and providing them with a permanent URL, perma.cc is intended to provide longer-term verifiability and context for academic literature and caselaw. Perma.cc is administered by a network of academic and government libraries.

In 2016, Harvard received a $700,000 grant from the Institute for Museum and Library Services to expand development of perma.cc.

Design

Perma.cc initiates page saves by user request only, it does not crawl the web and save pages like the Wayback Machine. A user account is required to save a page. Its target audience are organizations such as libraries, academic journals, law courts and school faculty. It provides support for organizational membership and administration of user accounts. Metadata such as notes can be added which are viewable to members within an organization. Pages can be made public or private within an organization. In 2017, Perma.cc added individual accounts limited to 10 free page saves per month, and commercial option for non-academic organizations to create institutional accounts. In January 2019, free individual accounts stopped receiving 10 free links on a recurring basis each month.

Perma.cc saves both a Web ARChive (or "warc") file format version and a screen-shot version in PNG.

Perma.cc has an API for functions such as adding or deleting pages. Perma.cc is part of the Memento network; thus, all public pages can be searched for (by URL) using the Memento API.

See also 

 Archive.today
 Digital preservation
 List of Web archiving initiatives
 WebCite

References

External links 
 
 Contingency plan

Computer-related introductions in 2013
Harvard Library
Web archiving initiatives